Liz Chandler (formerly Courtney, DiMera, Craig, and Curtis) is a fictional character on the soap opera, Days of Our Lives, and was played by actress Gloria Loring from 1980 to 1986.

Storylines
Liz came to Salem in 1980. She is the daughter of Kellam Chandler, the former governor of the state in which Salem is situated. She is also a singer, and was the headlining cabaret act at Salem's nightclub Doug's Place owned by Doug Williams and Neil Curtis. One of the memorable songs performed by Liz was "Friends and Lovers", which was recorded as a duet by Loring with singer Carl Anderson and became a hit single on the US pop chart. In 1983, she shot Marie Horton, whom she hated because Marie was married to her great love, Neil Curtis. Liz was sent to prison but was later released on parole. In 1986, she left Salem.

External links
Liz at soapcentral.com

Chandler, Liz